Alex Loves... is the eighth studio album by American recording artist Alexander O'Neal. It was originally released in January 2008, on the label EMI as the follow-up to his 2002 album Saga of a Married Man. The album is considered to be a departure from O'Neal's sound, because it consists of cover versions mainly of standard R&B songs, with the exception of the last song "We're On Our Way", which was co-written by O'Neal.

The album was received negatively by the majority of music critics, while other reviewers noted good points to the album. The album peaked at #49 in the UK, and was his first charting album of new material for 6 years.

Critical reception
In a retrospective review, Sharon Mawer of AllMusic gave the album two and a half out of five stars (his poorest star rating) and wrote that "the choice of songs on Alex Loves was rather a strange mixture and most simply didn't work" also adding that "Not an album to recommend except to the die-hard fans who kept his name alive while he was away."

Track listing

Personnel
Credits are adapted from the album's liner notes.

"Secret Lovers"
Nat Augustin – guitars; keyboards; programming; backing vocals
Leigh Guest – keyboards; programming
Mica Paris – backing vocals
Fay Jones – backing vocals
"A Million Love Songs"
Andy Whitmore – guitars; keyboards; programming
Leigh Guest – keyboards; programming
Nat Augustin – backing vocals
"Right Here Waiting"
Edward Stewart – guitars
Andy Whitmore – keyboards; programming
Leigh Guest – keyboards; programming
"Unbreak My Heart"
Edward Stewart – guitars
Andy Whitmore – keyboards; programming
Leigh Guest – keyboards; programming
James Davies – trumpet
Angelo Starr – backing vocals
Nat Augustin – backing vocals
Fay Jones – backing vocals
"Your Song"
Edward Stewart – guitars
Richard Denapoli – live drums
Andy Whitmore – keyboards; programming
Leigh Guest – keyboards; programming
"Saturday Love"
Bianca Lindgren – guest vocals; backing vocals
Edward Stewart – guitars
Andy Whitmore – keyboards; programming
Leigh Guest – keyboards; programming
Nat Augustin – backing vocals
Angelo Starr – backing vocals
"If You Were Here Tonight"
Nat Augustin – guitars; keyboards; programming; backing vocals
Leigh Guest – keyboards; programming
Ann Augustin – backing vocals
"What You Won't Do For Love"
Nat Augustin – keyboards; programming; trombone; backing vocals
Leigh Guest – keyboards; programming
James Davies – trumpet
Fay Jones – backing vocals
Angelo Starr – backing vocals

"When a Man Loves a Woman"
Andy Whitmore – guitars; keyboards; programming
Edward Stewart – guitars
Richard Denapoli – live drums
Pat Byrne – bass guitar
Leigh Guest – keyboards; programming
James Davies – trumpet
Nat Augustin – backing vocals
"Babe"
Andy Whitmore – guitars; keyboards; programming
Richard Denapoli – live drums
Leigh Guest – keyboards; programming
Angelo Starr – backing vocals
Nat Augustin – backing vocals
Fay Jones – backing vocals
"Always & Forever"
Nat Augustin – guitars; keyboards; programming; backing vocals
Richard Denapoli – live drums
Leigh Guest – keyboards; programming
Ann Augustin – backing vocals
"You're the First, the Last, My Everything"
Nat Augustin – guitars; backing vocals
Edward Stewart – guitars
Richard Denapoli – live drums
Pat Byrne – bass guitar
Leigh Guest – keyboards; programming
Andy Whitmore – keyboards; programming
James Davies – trumpet
Fay Jones – backing vocals
"Cherish"
Leigh Guest – keyboards; programming
Andy Whitmore – keyboards; programming
Angelo Starr – backing vocals
Nat Augustin – backing vocals
"I'll Make Love to You"
Nigel Lowis – keyboards; programming; string arrangements
Leigh Guest – keyboards; programming
Angelo Starr – backing vocals
Nat Augustin – backing vocals
"We're On Our Way"
Nat Augustin – guitars; keyboards; programming; backing vocals

Charts

References

External links

Alexander O'Neal albums
Covers albums
2008 albums
EMI Records albums